Vasile Lucian Pop (born 4 November 1989) is a Romanian professional footballer who plays as a midfielder or forward for Oașul Negrești-Oaș in the Liga IV.

Honours
Minaur Baia Mare
Liga III: 2020–21

References

External links
 

1989 births
Living people
Sportspeople from Cluj-Napoca
Romanian footballers
Association football midfielders
Association football forwards
Liga I players
ACF Gloria Bistrița players
Liga II players
FC Universitatea Cluj players
CS Minaur Baia Mare (football) players
FC Olimpia Satu Mare players
CS Luceafărul Oradea players
ACS Viitorul Târgu Jiu players